Neil Casey (born July 28, 1981) is an American actor, writer, and comedian. Casey served as a writer for the NBC sketch comedy series Saturday Night Live from 2012 to 2013, and the Comedy Central series Inside Amy Schumer in 2014, receiving Primetime Emmy Award nominations for Outstanding Writing for a Variety Series for both shows. As an actor, he was a series regular on the comedies Other Space (2015) and Making History (2017). Casey also appeared in the 2016 reboot of Ghostbusters.

Career 
Casey graduated from the University of Delaware with a B.A. in English, including a concentration in drama and minoring in Theatre. He started his career in theatre in 2001 and worked at UCB Theatre, where he has also taught since 2007. He directed, wrote, and acted in several shows at the theatre.

Acting career 
In 2015, Casey starred in the Yahoo! Screen series Other Space, created by Paul Feig.

In July 2015, Casey was cast in his first breakthrough film, Ghostbusters, the reboot of the 1984 film, playing a villain named Rowan North. The film reunited Casey with Other Space creator Feig and cast members Eugene Cordero, Bess Rous, Karan Soni, and Milana Vayntrub. It was released on July 15, 2016 by Sony Pictures Entertainment.

In 2017, Casey began co-starring opposite Adam Pally in the Fox time-travel comedy Making History; he played the role of Sam Adams.

Writing career 
In 2012, Casey was hired to write comedy sketches for Saturday Night Live's season 38. He was nominated for a Primetime Emmy Award for Outstanding Writing for a Variety Series at the 65th show in 2013. He was also nominated for a Writers Guild of America Award in 2013 and 2015 in the category of Comedy/Variety (including talk) series.

In 2014, Casey was nominated for a Primetime Emmy Award for Outstanding Writing for a Variety Series at the 66th show for his work on Inside Amy Schumer. He was also nominated for a Writers Guild of America Award in 2014 in the category of Comedy/Variety (including talk) series.

In 2015, Casey wrote for the third season of Kroll Show.

Filmography

Film

Television

As writer

References

External links 
 
 

Living people
American male film actors
People from Wilmington, Delaware
American male screenwriters
American male comedians
University of Delaware alumni
American male stage actors
American stand-up comedians
American male television actors
Male actors from Delaware
Writers from Delaware
1981 births
21st-century American dramatists and playwrights
21st-century American male actors
American male dramatists and playwrights
Upright Citizens Brigade Theater performers
21st-century American male writers
Screenwriters from Delaware
21st-century American comedians
21st-century American screenwriters